The Legend of 5 Mile Cave is an American western film, starring Jill Wagner, Adam Baldwin and Jet Jurgensmeyer. It premiered on June 9, 2019, and was produced by INSP.

Following its airing on US cable television, the film became available on a number of streaming platforms.

Plot
The film stars Jill Wagner, who plays the role of Susan, a widowed mother attempting to save the family farm from foreclosure. It is set in the 1920s in Kentucky. The film starts when a peculiar man arrives at the farm wanting to rent a room. The mysterious man is played by Adam Baldwin, and over time, he begins to bond with Susan's son, played by Jet Jurgensmeyer. He recounts the stories from the 1800s of the legendary gunslinger, Shooter Green, played by Jeremy Sumpter. It is shot over two timelines, past and present before the two timelines collide. The man's secrets could help save the farm.

Main cast

 Adam Baldwin as Sam Barnes
 Jeremy Sumpter as Young 'Shooter' Green
 Jill Wagner as Susan Tilwicky
 Jet Jurgensmeyer as Tommy Tilwicky
 Allie DeBerry as Josie Hayes
 Randy Wayne as Young John 'Doc' Small
 William Shockley as Sheriff John 'Doc' Small

 Tom Proctor as Virgil Harp
 Danny Vinson as Sheriff Bean
 Rob Moran as William Davis
 Mark Jeffrey Miller as Wade Kinsley
 Roxzane T. Mims as Sally
 Stefanie Butler as Martha Lowry

Reception
As of 2022, The Legend of 5 Mile Cave has a rating of 4.4/5 on Amazon Prime. Once Upon a Time in a Western gave the film 4 out of 5, stating it was "a well-done, well-acted family Western that’s longer on story than action and still manages to be quite entertaining." Cowboys & Indians magazine referred to the film as an "old-fashioned, family-friendly western." The Dove Foundation and also La Vanguardia, and others, gave the film a positive review.

References

2019 Western (genre) films
American Western (genre) films